Parancistrus is a small genus of suckermouth armored catfishes native to South America.

Taxonomy
Three species - Hypostomus aurantiacus, H. nigricans and H. vicinus - were described by François Louis de la Porte, comte de Castelnau in 1855. Parancistrus was described by Pieter Bleeker in 1862 and P. aurantiacus designated as type. Later, P. nigricans and P. vicinus were deemed to be synonyms of P. aurantiacus, making P. aurantiacus the only species of Parancistrus until P. nudiventris was described in 2005.

Species
There are currently two recognized species in this genus:
 Parancistrus aurantiacus (Castelnau, 1855)
 Parancistrus nudiventris Rapp Py-Daniel & Zuanon, 2005

Appearance and anatomy
Parancistrus is unique among loricariids due to the presence of fleshy folds on the naked area around the dorsal fin and at the pectoral fin points insertion in the breeding males. Breeding males also have elongated odontodes on their bodies and pectoral fin spines.

Parancistrus have stout bodies that are completely plated in adults. The dorsal fin membrane connects to the adipose fin spine. Their color is typically slate gray to black, occasionally with white streaks. They have large gill openings, which makes the genus different from all other loricariids except some Pogonopoma and Rhinelepis.

References

Ancistrini
Fish of South America
Fauna of Brazil
Catfish genera
Taxa named by Pieter Bleeker
Freshwater fish genera